Sabah is a state in Malaysia.

Sabah may also refer to:

People
 Sabah (singer) (1925-2014), Lebanese singer/actress
 Sabah Al-Khalid Al-Sabah (born 1953), Kuwaiti royal and politician
 Miguel Sabah (born 1979), Mexican footballer
 Sabah Habas Mustapha, bassist with the progressive rock band Camel, also known as Colin Bass

Other uses
 Sabah (film), a 2005 Canadian film
 Sabah (music), a Turkmen term for a musical scale
 Sabah (newspaper), a Turkish newspaper
 Sabah, Iran, a village in Khuzestan Province, Iran
 Sabah FC (Azerbaijan), an Azerbaijani football club
 Sabah F.C. (Malaysia), a Malaysian football club
 Sabah Wildlife Department, in Sabah, Malaysia
 , a Bornean coaster
 House of Al-Sabah, the ruling family of Kuwait
 Skating Association for the Blind and Handicapped (SABAH)

See also 
Daily Sabah, a Turkish newspaper 
Sabbah (disambiguation)
Saba (disambiguation)